Shalom "Shuli" Rand (also spelled Shuly; ; born 8 February 1962) is an Israeli film actor, writer, and singer. He is a Breslover Hasid and is best known in the English-speaking world for his role as the protagonist in Ushpizin (2004), for which he wrote the screenplay.

Biography
Shalom (Shuli) Rand was born to a Religious Zionist family in Bnei Brak. His father, Professor Yaakov Rand, a winner of the Israel Prize for his contribution to special education, is a chazzan. He attended the Or Etzion yeshiva until age 18. After compulsory army service, Rand attended the Nissan Nativ Acting Studio in Tel Aviv and became an actor, abandoning Orthodox practice. 

In 1996, he returned to observant Judaism. He later joined the Breslov Hasidic movement and moved to Jerusalem. He is a student of Rabbi Shalom Arush. Rand withdrew from acting to realize his religious aspirations, but after a six-year hiatus he returned to the theater, performing in one-man plays.

Rand and his first wife had together seven children. In 2004 he and his wife founded the Jewish Theatre of Jerusalem.

Acting and film career
Rand rose to stardom at age 26 after playing the lead role in Andrzej Wajda's play The Dybbuk at Habima theater. Rand was chosen Israel's Theater Actor of the Year several times.
In 2004 Rand wrote, directed, and starred in the film Ushpizin. He cast his wife, Michal Batsheva Rand, also a baalat teshuva, as the protagonist's wife. While Michal Batsheva had no prior acting experience, Rand insisted on playing opposite her rather than another woman for halakhic reasons. In keeping with the halakhic standards of tzniut (modesty), the fictional husband and wife do not touch each other on screen.

Rand has also acted in Hameuad, Eddie King (1992), Life According to Agfa (1992), and New Land (1994). In 2018 he appeared in the dystopian drama miniseries, Autonomies.

Singing career

After Ushpizin, Rand embarked on a music career, performing mostly for secular audiences. In 2008 he released his first album, Nekuda Tova ("Good Point") with 11 songs, which he composed himself based on the teachings of Rebbe Nachman of Breslov. Over 30,000 copies of the self-released CD were sold within 4 months, and it was awarded a gold album in Israel.

Awards and recognition
Rand won the Ophir Award given by the Israel Film Academy twice. He was named Best Supporting Actor in 1993 for Life According to Agfa, and Best Actor in 2004 for Ushpizin.

Discography
 (2008)
Shuli Rand Live (2010)
Back and Forth (2018)
Shuli Sings Benayoun (2022)

References

External links

1962 births
Living people
Baalei teshuva
Israeli Orthodox Jews
Jewish Israeli male actors
21st-century Israeli male singers
People from Bnei Brak
Breslov Hasidim
Israeli people of Romanian-Jewish descent
Hasidic singers
Israeli male screenwriters
Israeli male stage actors